Doors Open Toronto is an annual event when approximately 150 buildings of architectural, historic, cultural, and social significance to the city of Toronto open their doors to the public for this free citywide event.

Doors Open Toronto was developed as a millennium project in 2000, by the City of Toronto (developed from a European model) and has since attracted over 1.7 million residents and tourists. Doors Open Toronto gives people of all ages and backgrounds the opportunity to learn about Toronto's history, get involved and celebrate Toronto's built heritage.
 
Toronto was the first city in North America to launch this type of program. Many participating buildings organize guided tours, exhibits, displays, and activities to enrich the visitor experience.

Due to the COVID-19 pandemic in Toronto, the 2020 and 2021 editions of the event were cancelled.

Highlighted buildings 

Most buildings are open from 10 a.m. to 5 p.m. on both Saturday and Sunday; however some only open for limited hours. The public is advised to check the "buildings to visit" section of the official website. The list of buildings is made public on May 1 of the calendar year. Some Doors Open Toronto highlighted buildings include: R.C. Harris Water Treatment Plant, Mackenzie House, and TTC carhouses.

Sponsors 
Doors Open Toronto relies heavily on the support of sponsors. The Toronto Star releases the official Doors Open Toronto program guide in May of each year and has been a vital supporter of the program.  In 2012, City TV and Omni Television also came on board as Doors Open Toronto media sponsors.

Volunteers 
Doors Open Toronto is managed by the Cultural Services and Special Events Departments at the City of Toronto. Doors Open Toronto relies on the support, as well as enthusiasm of hundreds of volunteers.

Applications are available each fall and can be found on the Doors Open Toronto website.

Awards 
 2009	Canadian Urban Institute at the Urban Leadership awards - City Soul Award
 2010	City Manager's Award for Toronto Public Service Excellence
 2010	The Canadian Museums Association Awards of Outstanding Achievement

Dates and themes 
The first Doors Open Toronto was held in May 2000. Since then, Doors Open Toronto has been held on the fourth weekend of May. In recent years, each festival has been curated around a theme.

 2000: May 27, 28
 2001: May 26, 27
 2002: May 25, 26
 2003: May 24, 25
 2004: May 29, 30
 2005: May 28, 29
 2006: May 27, 28
 2007: May 26, 27 – Sustainability
 2008: May 24, 25 – Sacred Space
 2009: May 23, 24 – Toronto's Literature
 2010: May 29, 30 – Architecture
 2011: May 28, 29 – Photography
 2012: May 26, 27 – 200 Years of Building Our City
 2013: May 25, 26 – Creators, Makers and Innovators
 2014: May 24, 25 – Secrets and Spirits; Exploring the Mysteries Behind the Door
 2015: May 23, 24 – Sports, Recreation and Leisure
 2016: May 28, 29 – Re-used, Re-visited and Revised
 2017: May 27, 28 – Fifteen Decades of Canadian Architecture
 2018: May 26, 27 – Film: The Great Romance
 2019: May 25, 26 – 20 Something
 2020: The event was originally scheduled for May 23 and 24; however, due to the evolving situation surrounding the COVID-19 pandemic, and with major events and festivals being banned by the City of Toronto until at least June 30, 2020, the event was cancelled.
2021: The event was originally scheduled for May 29 and 30; it was cancelled due to the ongoing COVID-19 pandemic.

Complete list of participating venues since 2004

Sources for the above table:

Gallery

See also
Doors Open Canada
List of oldest buildings and structures in Toronto
Open House Chicago
Open House New York

References

External links

Toronto Star Doors Open Site

Toronto

Buildings and structures
Buildings and structures
Recurring events established in 2000
2000 establishments in Ontario
May events